Elvis Stuglis (born 4 July 1993) is a Latvian footballer who plays as a centre-back for Rīgas FS and the Latvia national team.

Career
Stuglis made his international debut for Latvia on 7 October 2020 in a friendly match against Montenegro, which finished as a 1–1 away draw.

Career statistics

International

References

External links
 
 
 Elvis Stuglis at Latvian Football Federation

1993 births
Living people
Footballers from Riga
Latvian footballers
Latvia youth international footballers
Latvia under-21 international footballers
Latvia international footballers
Association football central defenders
JFK Olimps players
Skonto FC players
FS METTA/Latvijas Universitāte players
FK Spartaks Jūrmala players
Riga FC players
Latvian Higher League players